Terry Bozeman (born 1 January 1950) is an American actor. He appears as Dr. Lee Craig on Desperate Housewives. He played Richard Armus on the thriller 24. He also plays lawyers for NCIS, CSI, and CSI: Miami. He is a 1977 graduate of The Goodman School of Drama in Chicago, Illinois. He also played the father of the Martin clan in the Christian values series, McGee and Me!.

Filmography

References

External links 
 

Living people
American male television actors
DePaul University alumni
Place of birth missing (living people)
1950 births